Elmer is an unincorporated community in Elmer Township, Saint Louis County, Minnesota, United States.  The community is located near Meadowlands at the intersection of County Road 199 (Elmer Road) and County Road 193 (Bailey Road).

Saint Louis County Highway 5, County Highway 133, and Meadowlands Trunk Road are all in the vicinity.  The Saint Louis River is nearby.

References

 Official State of Minnesota Highway Map – 2011/2012 edition

Unincorporated communities in St. Louis County, Minnesota
Unincorporated communities in Minnesota